Quercus cualensis is a rare species of oak. It has been found only in a small region in the State of Jalisco in western Mexico, in the Sierra el Cuale mountains south of Puerto Vallarta.

Description 
The leaves are thin, flat, and hairless, narrowly lance-shaped, up to 15 cm long.

References

cualensis
Flora of the Trans-Mexican Volcanic Belt
Trees of Jalisco
Endemic oaks of Mexico
Plants described in 2003